Bride of Vengeance is a 1949 adventure film set in the Italian Renaissance era, directed by Mitchell Leisen.

Plot 
Lucrezia Borgia's brother Cesare Borgia has her second husband Prince Bisceglie killed in order to marry her to Alfonso I d'Este, Duke of Ferrara, whose well-defended lands lay between the Borgia's Papal States and Venice, which Cesare wants to conquer. Cesare ensures Lucretia blames Alfonso for the murder and, encouraged by Cesare, she plots deadly revenge against her new husband. When the poison she gives him is counter-acted, and she realizes Cesare really killed her second husband, she returns to help Alfonso defend Ferrara against Cesare's army.

Cesare retreats, killing Michellotto, who wanted to continue the fight. In the final scene, the couple drink to their love.

Cast
 Paulette Goddard as Lucrezia Borgia
 John Lund as Alfonso I d'Este, Duke of Ferrara
 Macdonald Carey as Cesare Borgia
 Albert Dekker as Vanetti
 John Sutton as Prince Bisceglie
 Raymond Burr as Michelotto

Reception 
In a review for Los Angeles Times, Philip K. Scheuer wrote that "These people [...] are not kidding the parts and they are not fooling themselves; they are too smart for that. They know they have a dud and they are stuck with it--but as a last resort they are trying to put it over to the audience for whatever that audience may read into it--satire, history, melodrama or just a chance to get off its feet for an hour and half. On that last account 'Bride of Vengeance' probably qualifies. It is better than looking at a blank wall".

Bosley Crowther of New York Times wrote that "Miss Goddard plays Lucretia as a grand-dame right out of a wardrobe room, with the suavity and voluptuousness of a model in a display of lingerie" and "[a]s Alfonso, addressed as 'Magnificence,' John Lund gives a fair picture of a nice American prankster got up for a fancy-dress ball," concluding the review with "Bride of Vengeance is an obvious masquerade".

John M. Coppinger's review in The Washington Post stated that it was "simple, sheer, unadorned escapist stuff. As a work of art, it makes no pretensions. It's a lavish spectacle of hokum... No attempt has been made at accuracy in the presentation of this historical romance". Coppinger wrote that director Leisen "has gotten much comedy in a film which could easily have turned out to be a flop".

Costuming (by Mary Grant) was given as the film's chief strength by Mae Tinee in a review for Chicago Daily Tribune.

References

External links
 
 

1949 films
1940s historical drama films
American historical drama films
Films directed by Mitchell Leisen
American black-and-white films
Films scored by Hugo Friedhofer
Films set in Italy
Films set in the 16th century
Cultural depictions of Cesare Borgia
Cultural depictions of Lucrezia Borgia
1949 drama films
1940s English-language films
1940s American films